The Royal Agricultural Society of Victoria (RASV) was founded in 1848, when a group of Melbourne's leading citizens formed the Agricultural Society of Victoria with the aim of "furthering the quality of Australia's primary production by means of contests and competitions".

RASV promotes the development of and celebrates agriculture through agricultural events and food and drinks awards programs.

RASV's flagship event, the Royal Melbourne Show attracts around 450,000 people each year.

Runs
 Royal Melbourne Show
 Royal Melbourne Poultry Show
 Australian International Beer Awards
 Australian Distilled Spirits Awards
 Australian Food Awards
 Melbourne Showgrounds
 Royal Melbourne Alpaca Show
 Australian International Coffee Awards
 Royal Melbourne Wine Awards

References

External links

Agriculture in Victoria (Australia)
Agricultural organisations based in Australia
Organisations based in Australia with royal patronage
1840 establishments in Australia